Conventual sweets are a typical part of the Portuguese cuisine and a generic term to a variety of sweets in Portugal. As the name implies, conventual sweets were made by nuns who lived in the Portuguese convents and monasteries. Starting in the 15th century, these sweets have since integrated in the Portuguese cuisine and in former Portuguese colonies. Conventual sweets have sugar, egg yolks and almond as ingredients of choice.

History
Conventual sweets have always been present in the meals that were served in the convents, but only from the 15th century, with the dissemination and expansion of sugar, did they reach notoriety. Sugar cane production was tried in the Algarve, followed by Madeira in the 15th century. At the time Portugal was one of the largest egg producers in Europe and the excess amount of egg yolks was initially thrown away or given to animals as food. With the expansion of the Portuguese empire and the large-scale arrival of sugar from the Portuguese colonies, a new destination was given to the egg yolks. From the 16th century, the art of confectionery is cultivated, with great refinement, by almost all Monasteries and Convents in the country. From the middle of the 19th century, when the extinction of Religious Orders in Portugal was decreed, nuns and monks were faced with the need to raise money for their livelihood. The sale of Conventual sweets was one of the ways found to minimize their financial situation. These recipes were then passed from generation to generation and have since integrated in the Portuguese cuisine.

Non-specific to a province

Castanhas de Ovos
Suspiro
Cavaca
Lampreia de ovos
Pão-de-ló
Toucinho do Céu
Filhós
Rabanadas
Pastel de nata
Fios de ovos
Papo-de-anjo

Specific to a province

Minho

Meias Luas
Papas Doces de Carolo
Fidalguinhos
Pudim Abade de Priscos
Fataunços (Braga)
Charuto de Ovos
Pastel de São Francisco
Bolacha do Bom Jesus
Morcela Doce de Arouca
Clarinha de Fão
Barriga de Freira

Douro Litoral
Sapateta
Perronilha
Lérias de Amarante
Tabefe
Pescoços de freira
Amarantino
Pão podre
Foguetes de Amarante

Trás-os-Montes
Morcelas
Jerimús
Madalenas do Convento
Doce de viúvas
Bolo de nozes de Bragança
Sestas
Pitos de Santa Luzia
Creme da madre Joaquina
Velharoco
Queijadas de gila

Beira Litoral

Pastel do Lorvão
Nabada de Semide
Morcelas de Arouca
Arrufada
Nógado de Semide
Pudim de Ovos das Clarissas (Coimbra)
Melícias
Trouxas de ovos moles
Manjar Branco
Queijada de Pereira
Pastel de Tentúgal
Ovos Moles de Aveiro

Beira Alta & Beira Baixa
Lâminas
Grade
Bolo de São Vicente
Argolinhas do Loreto
Taroucos de Salzedas
Esquecidos
Cavacas de Santa Clara
Bica
Bolo Paraíso
Bolo São Francisco
Sardinhas Doces de Trancoso

Ribatejo

Sonhos da Esperança
Sopapo do Convento
Palha de Abrantes
Celeste de Santarém
Fatias de Tomar
Tigeladas
Broas das Donas
Bica

Estremadura

Bom bocado
Argolas
Travesseiros
Tibornas
Bolos de Abóbora
Brisa do Lis
Delícias de Frei João
Fitas de Páscoa
Castanhas de Ovos
Marmelada Branca de Odivelas
Pão-de-Ló de Alfeizerão
Nozes de Cascais
Pastel de feijão

Alentejo

Bolo podre
Fatias reais
Bolo de chavão
Coalhada do Convento
Biscoitos do Cardeal
Padinhas
Almendrados
Orelhas de Abade
Sopa dourada de Santa Clara
Bom bocado
Encharcada
Sericaia
Pão de rala
Formigos
Tiborna de Ovos
Torrão Real de Ovos
Bolo Fidalgo
Queijo Dourado
Presunto Doce

Algarve

Biscoita
Bolo de alfarroba
Bolo de chila e amêndoa
Bolo de amêndoas e nozes
Doce fino
Morgado
Queijo de figo
Queijinhos
Dom Rodrigo
Massapão
Pudim da Serra
Torta de alfarroba
Torta de amêndoa

Madeira

Bolo preto
Bolo de mel
Bolinhos de azeite
Mexericos de freiras
Frangolho
Creme de chocolate madeirense

Azores

Bolo micaelense
Bolo do diabo
Hóstias de amêndoa
Malassada
Rendilhado
Coquinho
Cornucópia
Pudim Irmã Bensaúde

References 

Portuguese cuisine
Portuguese desserts